This is a list of episodes of the 26-episode anime series R.O.D the TV animated by J.C.Staff, produced by Aniplex, directed by Koji Masunari, scripted by  Hideyuki Kurata and licensed internationally by Aniplex of America (previously Geneon Entertainment) and Madman Entertainment. The series is the sequel to the Read or Die OVA (although the repercussions of the events in that story are not felt until halfway through the series). The series follows the lives of Nenene, Michelle, Maggie and Anita, who battle the sinister Dokusensha and the British Library Special Operations Division.

The series first aired its two episodes on September 1, 2003 and concluded with the last two episodes on March 16, 2004.

Half of the episode titles are based on novels of the same name.

Episodes

References

Episodes
R.O.D the TV